Duane Woodward (born June 4, 1976) is an American former professional basketball player and assistant coach for the Rhode Island Rams. He played most of his career overseas.

Playing career
A four-year starter at Boston College from 1994 to 1998, Woodward was a member of the 1996 and 1997 Eagles team that advanced to the second round of the NCAA tournament. In 1997, Boston College captured Big East regular season and tournament titles and Woodward was named to the Big East All-Tournament team that winter. He capped his collegiate career by earning Second Team All-Big East honors in 1998 when he averaged 15.6 points, 5.1 assists, 4.3 rebounds and 2.1 steals per game.

Following college, Woodward embarked on a 13-year professional career overseas, playing in over 10 different countries. During his tenure in the Cyprus League for AEL Limassol, Woodward helped lead AEL to back-to-back championships in 2003 and 2004. His career accolades include 2004 Eurobasket.com All-FIBA EuropeLeague Player of the Year as well as 2003 and 2004 Eurobasket.com All-Cyprus League Player of the Year honors.

Coaching career
During his playing days, in between his playing stints overseas, Woodward worked as the 16U and seniors/prep coach for AAU team New York Panthers since 2008. He also served as coach and instructor at a number of basketball camps. He then served as an assistant coach at the State University of New York Maritime College, before joining the coaching staff at Queens College as an assistant in 2013, followed by a stint as Assistant Video Coordinator at Fordham’s Men's Basketball coaching staff.

On August 18, 2014, Monmouth hired Duane Woodward as an assistant coach.

On July 2, 2018, Woodward was hired by Seton Hall as assistant coach, replacing Fred Hill.

References

External links
 Euroleague Profile 
 Italian League Profile

1976 births
Living people
AEL Limassol B.C. players
African-American basketball players
American expatriate basketball people in Argentina
American expatriate basketball people in Austria
American expatriate basketball people in Croatia
American expatriate basketball people in Cyprus
American expatriate basketball people in France
American expatriate basketball people in Germany
American expatriate basketball people in Greece
American expatriate basketball people in Italy
American expatriate basketball people in Lebanon
American expatriate basketball people in Serbia
American expatriate basketball people in Venezuela
American men's basketball players
Basketball players from New York City
Benjamin N. Cardozo High School alumni
Boca Juniors basketball players
Boston College Eagles men's basketball players
Guards (basketball)
KK FMP (1991–2011) players
KK Split players
Mens Sana Basket players
Monmouth Hawks men's basketball coaches
Olympique Antibes basketball players
Peristeri B.C. players
Roseto Sharks players
Seton Hall Pirates men's basketball coaches
Teramo Basket players
Trenton Shooting Stars players
21st-century African-American sportspeople
20th-century African-American sportspeople